The Slack–Comstock–Marshall Farm is a farm in Uniontown, Arkansas. Built in 1918, the farmhouse was constructed in the Plain Traditional style and has an uncommon vernacular design. The house was originally built as a small building and was later expanded by adding rooms, a common practice at the time. However, the Slack–Comstock–Marshall farmhouse is unusual in that it was expanded by a large three-room, -story addition with a cross gable roof. A wraparound porch was also added to the house to integrate the large addition with the rest of the design. The farm was used by three families to raise livestock and grow cotton, corn, and strawberries; it is now owned by descendants of the Marshall family.

The farm was added to the National Register of Historic Places on June 9, 1995.

Gallery

References

Farms on the National Register of Historic Places in Arkansas
Houses completed in 1918
Buildings and structures in Crawford County, Arkansas
National Register of Historic Places in Crawford County, Arkansas